Marlene van Gansewinkel (born 11 March 1995) is a Dutch Paralympic athlete. In 2021, she won the gold medal in both the women's 100 metres T64 and 200 metres T64 events at the 2020 Summer Paralympics in Tokyo, Japan. She also won the bronze medal in the women's long jump T64 event.

In 2016, she won the bronze medal in the women's long jump T44 event at the 2016 Summer Paralympics in Rio de Janeiro, Brazil. She has also won medals in the long jump and in sprinting events at the World Para Athletics Championships and the World Para Athletics European Championships.

Early life 

She was born without her lower left leg and lower left arm.

Career 

Early in her career, she competed as a T44-classified athlete. In 2014, she competed in the women's 100 metres T44, 200 metres T44 and 400 metres T44 events at the IPC Athletics European Championships held in Swansea, Wales. She missed out on winning a medal as she finished in 4th place in all three events. At the 2015 IPC Athletics World Championships held in Doha, Qatar, she won the silver medal in the women's long jump T44 event.

She represented the Netherlands at the 2016 Summer Paralympics in Rio de Janeiro, Brazil and she won the bronze medal in the women's long jump T44 event. She also competed in the women's 100 metres T44 event where she finished in 7th place.

At the beginning of 2018, World Para Athletics implemented classification changes and, as of that year, she competes as a T64-classified athlete, a class specifically for athletes with a single below the knee amputation. In that year, she won the gold medal in both the women's 100 metres T64 and women's 200 metres T64 events at the 2018 World Para Athletics European Championships held in Berlin, Germany. In the 100 metres she also set a new world record of 12.85 seconds.

In 2019, she won the silver medal in the women's 100 metres T64 event at the World Para Athletics Championships held in Dubai, United Arab Emirates. She also won the silver medal in the women's long jump T64 event. She was disqualified in the women's 200 metres T64 event for running out of lane.

In 2021, she won the gold medal in the women's 200 metres T64 event at the World Para Athletics European Championships held in Bydgoszcz, Poland. She also won the silver medal in the women's 100 metres T64 and women's long jump T64 events. In the long jump she set a new personal best of 5.82 metres.

She represented the Netherlands at the 2020 Summer Paralympics in Tokyo, Japan. She won the gold medal in both the women's 100 metres T64 and 200 metres T64 events. She also won the bronze medal in the women's long jump T64 event.

Awards 

In 2018, she won the Dutch Paralympic Athlete of the Year award.

Achievements

Track

Field

References

External links 

 

Living people
1995 births
Sportspeople from Tilburg
Athletes (track and field) at the 2016 Summer Paralympics
Athletes (track and field) at the 2020 Summer Paralympics
Medalists at the 2016 Summer Paralympics
Medalists at the 2020 Summer Paralympics
Paralympic athletes of the Netherlands
Paralympic gold medalists for the Netherlands
Paralympic bronze medalists for the Netherlands
Dutch female long jumpers
Dutch female sprinters
Dutch amputees
Paralympic medalists in athletics (track and field)
Medalists at the World Para Athletics Championships
Medalists at the World Para Athletics European Championships
Female competitors in athletics with disabilities
20th-century Dutch women
21st-century Dutch women